The Union of Youth Struggle (ZWM) was a communist youth organization in Poland. ZWM was founded in 1942. It was linked to the Polish Workers Party (PPR). Hanka Szapiro-Sawicka was the founding leader of ZWM. She was killed by German authorities on 10 March 1943. Leadership of ZWM was then taken over by Jan Krasicki. Krasicki was shot by Gestapo on 2 September 1943. After Krasicki's death, Helena Jaworska became the ZWM leader. ZWM was active in the anti-fascist struggle, organizing People's Guard militia forces. ZWM played an important role in broadening the base of PPR. Walka Młodych ('Youth Struggle') was the central organ of ZWM.

As of 1947 ZWM had 224,000 members On 22 July 1948 ZWM and other youth organizations merged into the Polish Youth Union (ZMP).

References

Youth wings of political parties in Poland
Stalinism in Poland
Youth wings of communist parties
1942 establishments in Poland
1948 disestablishments in Poland
Youth organizations established in 1942